The Smart #3 (stylised as "smart #3") is a battery electric compact crossover SUV developed and produced by Smart Automobile, a joint venture between Mercedes-Benz Group and Geely Holding. It is the second vehicle produced by the joint venture. The model is based on the Sustainable Experience Architecture (SEA) electric vehicle platform developed by Geely.

Overview
In November 2022, the design was leaked as China's Ministry of Industry and Information Technology requires manufacturers to provide photos and data of the vehicles before selling them domestically.

References

3
Production electric cars
Upcoming car models
Crossover sport utility vehicles
Rear-wheel-drive vehicles